Fakenham Wood and Sapiston Great Grove is a  biological Site of Special Scientific Interest north of Sapiston in Suffolk.

These two coppice with standards woods comprise one of the largest areas of ancient woodland in the county. The ground flora is dominated by bracken and bramble, but there are also rides which provide habitats for butterflies, including the largest colony of white admirals in Suffolk.

The woods are private property with no public access.

References

Sites of Special Scientific Interest in Suffolk